Anton Glanzelius (born 11 April 1974 in Copenhagen, Denmark) is a Swedish actor widely known for My Life as a Dog (1985), for which he won the Best Actor at the 21st Guldbagge Awards.

As of 2014, Glanzelius worked as an executive producer at Swedish TV4 AB.  On March 26, 2015, Glanzelius became the new channel manager for TV4 Play. At the same time, he retained his role as deputy channel director for TV4 Group.

Early life
Glanzelius was born in Copenhagen to father Ingmar Glanzelius (1927-2021), a journalist and a freelance music critic, and mother Margita Ahlin, an actress and a director. Glanzelius has an older brother, Jacob. His maternal grandfather was actor Harry Ahlin. He grew up in Gothenburg, Sweden.  Glanzelius is of Danish descent from his father's side.

Acting career
Glanzelius's first role was in a television movie at age eight, as a messenger in a theatrical production of Antigone that starred his mother, and appeared four times on a Swedish television series.

My Life as a Dog and recognition
Film director Lasse Hallström discovered Glanzelius from the television series and asked him to try out for the lead role of Ingemar of the film, My Life as a Dog, along with about 1,000 other young actors. At first, Glanzelius was told that he was too young and too small for the part, but received another call a week later. "They said they couldn't find anyone better to do it than me," Glanzelius says. "I thought it would be fun and exciting. And it was. But we worked from morning to the night for 80 days. It was very hard. I was happy to get even a 5-minute break."

Filming challenges included Glanzelius having to spill a glass of milk on his face in one scene, which took 26 takes to film, as well as having to lose in a boxing match with an older tomboy character in another scene.

Film director Hallström described Glanzelius, who was 11 at the time of filming, as "very intuitive. It was like working with an adult."  Glanzelius later noted, "I just play(ed) myself."

In 1985, Glanzelius became the youngest person to win the Swedish Film Critics Award for Best Actor, Sweden's equivalent to the Oscar for the same category, for his role in My Life as a Dog.

My Life as Dog was a surprise hit in the United States, a rare occurrence for a subtitled foreign language film. American critics praised Glanzelius for his performance in the film, with Hal Hinson of The Washington Post describing him as "a pint-size Jack Nicholson, with devilish eyebrows that he knows how to use," and Vincent Canby of The New York Times who applauded him for his "firm and wise performance." The movie's success in the U.S. led Glanzelius to visit the country for the first time in 1987 as part of a nine-city, two-week tour accompanied with his parents. Cities he traveled into included Washington and Los Angeles. When he visited New York City, Sue Simmons got to interview Glanzelius.

"In the beginning everybody recognized me from the movie," he says. "Many would even point at me with their whole arm outstretched and talk about me very loud. I would have to look at the ground. That was not fun."  He says he had no idea he was so popular.  

Glanzelius was in talks to reprise his role in a now-shelved English-language sequel to the film.

Personal life
Glanzelius is fluent in Swedish and English.  He is also a fan of Eddie Murphy, Rod Stewart, Bill Cosby and Bruce Springsteen. Glanzelius also plays ice hockey and the piano.

Aspiration for soccer playing
Despite his stardom from My Life as a Dog, Glanzelius would later go on to say that he had no interest in pontificating about himself or the craft of acting. "Soccer is my number one priority," he says. "I hope to be a pro player in Brazil someday. I really love to play, and I think I can be what I want to be. It will be a natural for me."

"Anton is not obsessed with the idea of having a career in movies, thank God," his father said. "He loved working on the film and he's proud of his performance, but we've tried not to make too much of the success he's had. If we did, then everything he did for the rest of his life would measure against it as a failure. His first love is sports, and we encourage him in that because it provides something of a buffer between him and all this glamour."

"I don't wish for a dream part or anything like that," Glanzelius says. "I want to be a professional soccer player in Brazil." At the time of his recognition, Glanzelius was also a player on his hometown's junior soccer team. He said he was ranked among the 30 best soccer players in Gothenborg, and had planned to travel to Brazil after he completed school.

"If I suffered an injury and couldn't play, I might act in another movie," he concedes.  Glanzelius also stated that he does not care if he ever does another movie. Nonetheless, his dream of being a soccer player was never fulfilled.

Michael Jackson
At first, Glanzelius had not heard of Michael Jackson until he received a phone call at his parents' home in Gothenburg from Jackson.

While he was in Los Angeles in 1987, Glanzelius had the chance to meet Jackson, who personally invited him to his home after seeing My Life as a Dog twice. "Michael Jackson's house was so big and beautiful," Glanzelius says. "And he was very friendly. I liked him very much, but he was very shy." Glanzelius and his mother visited the Hayvenhurst estate, but only got to spend a couple of hours with Jackson. Glanzelius described Jackson as "very polite" but also very quiet. Glanzelius also got to meet and shake hands with Jackson's pet chimpanzee Bubbles.

A year later, Glanzelius got to spend a day with Jackson at the amusement park, Liseberg. The park's management closed Liseberg to the public for the day so that Glanzelius and Jackson would have the entire place to themselves, riding the latter's favorite roller coaster 12 times and spending an hour driving bumper cars. Glanzelius spent that night in Jackson's hotel room; in recent years, Glanzelius confirmed there was not the slightest hint of a sexual advance, referencing Jackson's reputation.

Jackson kept in contact with Glanzelius afterward until the Jordan Chandler scandal broke out. Glanzelius was reportedly shocked when he found out about the death of Michael Jackson in 2009. A day after Jackson's death, Glanzelius was interviewed by TV4 News on his experiences with Jackson.

References

Bibliography
 Holmstrom, John. The Moving Picture Boy: An International Encyclopaedia from 1895 to 1995. Norwich, Michael Russell, 1996, p. 396.

External links
 
 Anton Glanzelius interview on YouTube
 Glanzelius minns vännen Michael Jackson Interview in Swedish

1974 births
Living people
Swedish male child actors
Swedish male film actors
Best Actor Guldbagge Award winners
People from Gothenburg
Swedish people of Danish descent
Danish emigrants to Sweden